Choir Boy is a 2005 novel by Charlie Jane Anders.

Plot
Berry, a 12-year-old boy, wants nothing more than to remain a choirboy. Desperate to keep his voice from changing, Berry tries to injure himself, and then convinces a clinic to give him testosterone-inhibiting drugs that keep his voice from deepening but also cause him to grow breasts. Suddenly Berry's thrown into a world of unexpected gender issues that push him into a universe far more complex than anything he's ever known.

Reception
Choir Boy won the 2005 Lambda Literary Award for Transgender Literature.

Tikkun described it as "engaging", noting its "believable, frustrating quality", and lauded Anders for "handl[ing] issues of gender (and religion, race, and class)  with a light touch."

Kirkus Reviews called it "groundbreaking and unflinching", with Berry's story being "memorable", but overall faulted it for a "lack of a cohesive voice and too much figurative language", with "[a]trocious metaphors, sloppy editing and too many pithy observations [that] detract from the prose."

References

English-language novels
2005 American novels
Novels with transgender themes
American LGBT novels
Novels with gay themes
Lambda Literary Award-winning works
Soft Skull Press books